Frances Elizabeth "Fanny" King, née Bernard (25 July 1757 – 23 December 1821) was an English philanthropist and author.

Life

She was born in Lincoln, the eight child of Sir Francis Bernard and his wife Amelia, née Offley. Among her siblings was Thomas Bernard (1750-1818) who was also involved in many philanthropic projects.

Francis Bernard became in 1758 Governor of the Province of New Jersey in America and moved there with his family, subsequently becoming Governor of the Province of Massachusetts Bay. But Frances who was apparently regarded as delicate remained in England with relatives and was not reunited with her family until their return in 1769.

In 1782, Frances married the Reverend Richard King by whom she was to have four children, of whom two died in infancy. Apart from this, until her eldest daughter Amelia married in 1802, her life at this period was uneventful.

In the same year, King began to assist her brother Thomas in the development of the "Society for Bettering the Condition of and Improving the Comforts of the Poor" (SBCP) based in Clapham, London. She was also involved in founding schools and libraries in her husbands parishes, and at this time became acquainted with the philanthropist Hannah More. Following her husband's death in 1810, King moved to Gateshead where her daughters' husbands were clergymen, and continued to involve herself in works for the poor, including sick funds and the provision of clothing. She died in Gateshead in 1821. Among her grandchildren were the explorer Richard Collinson and the writer Julia Stretton.

Works
In 1774, Frances Bernard wrote The Rector's Memorandum Book, a sermonizing novel (not published until 1814 under her married name) which,  in the words of her biographer Mary Clare Martin, depicts "[an] exemplary Christian heroine...educating all the children in the village and nursing the sick. Forced to make an unhappy marriage, she [dies] a pious and early death."

Her first published work was A Tour in France (1808), based on a journal made during an eight-month stay in France after the death of her daughter Elizabeth in 1801. Other works included  The Beneficial Effects of the Christian Temper on Domestic Happiness (1809) and  Female Scripture Characters; Exemplifying Female Virtues, first published in 1811 and which became widely used in schools; by 1833 it reached its twelfth edition.

References

Sources

1757 births
1821 deaths
People from Lincoln, England
English religious writers
Women religious writers
English philanthropists
19th-century English women writers